West Bilney is a village and former civil parish on the A47 road,  west of Norwich, now in the parish of East Winch, in the King's Lynn and West Norfolk district, in the county of Norfolk, England. In 1931 the parish had a population of 188. Its church is dedicated to St Cecilia.

History 
The name "Bilney" probably means 'Bil(l)a's island'. West Bilney was recorded in the Domesday Book as Benelai/Bilenei/Binelai. On 1 April 1935 the parish was abolished and merged with East Winch.

Notable residents
Actor Stephen Fry owns a home in the village.

See also 
 Bilney railway station

References

External links 
 

Villages in Norfolk
Former civil parishes in Norfolk
King's Lynn and West Norfolk